Robert Raymond Broome "Bert" Oswald (born 20 December 1904, died 1961) was a Scottish footballer who played as a forward.

Career
Born in Bo'ness, Scotland Oswald played as a junior for Linlithgow Rose before being signed by Heart of Midlothian in November 1924. Oswald spent just over a year with Hearts but made only one league appearance before transferring to his home-town team Bo'ness in February 1926, with whom he won the Division Two title in 1927.

In June 1928, Oswald followed manager Angus Wylie to Reading, with the English side paying £400 for his services. Making his Football League debut against Middlesbrough on 25 August 1928, Oswald missed only two games over the next two seasons before being signed by Sheffield United who paid 'Boro £4,000 to take Oswald and Percy Thorpe to Bramall Lane. Oswald was primarily used on the left-wing and played three seasons for United but the club were relegated during the 1933–34 season.

Oswald moved to Southend United in May 1934 for £500 and remained with them until the outbreak of World War II, at which point he retired from playing.

References

1904 births
1961 deaths
People from Bo'ness
Scottish footballers
Association football forwards
Linlithgow Rose F.C. players
Heart of Midlothian F.C. players
Bo'ness F.C. players
Reading F.C. players
Sheffield United F.C. players
Southend United F.C. players
Scottish Football League players
English Football League players